The 1999–2000 Nashville Predators season was the Nashville Predators' second season in the National Hockey League (NHL). The Predators failed to qualify for the playoffs for the second year in a row.

Off-season

Regular season

Final standings

Game log

Player stats

Regular season
Scoring

Goaltending

      MIN = Minutes played; W = Wins; L = Losses; T/OT = Ties/overtime losses; GA = Goals-against; GAA = Goals-against average; SO = Shutouts; SA = Shots against; SV = Shots saved; SV% = Save percentage;

Awards and records

Transactions

Draft picks
Nashville's draft picks at the 1999 NHL Entry Draft held at the FleetCenter in Boston, Massachusetts.

See also
1999–2000 NHL season

References
 

Nash
Nash
Nashville Predators seasons
Nashville Predators
Nashville Predators